Janis K. Lee (born July 11, 1945) was the chief hearing officer for the Kansas Court of Tax Appeals from 2011 until 2013. She was a Democratic member of the Kansas Senate representing the 36th district from 1989 until 2011. She was Assistant Minority (Democratic) Leader of the Kansas Senate from 1997 until her appointment as a hearing officer. She was also the vice-president of the Unified School District 238 Board of Education.

In 2019, she was appointed by Governor Laura Kelly to co-chair the governor's Council on Tax Reform alongside former state Sen. Steve Morris.

Committee assignments
Sen. Lee served on these legislative committees:
 Utilities
 Joint Committee on Administrative Rules and Regulations
 Agriculture
 Joint Committee on Corrections and Juvenile Justice Oversight
 Joint Committee on Energy and Environmental Policy
 Joint Committee on Kansas Security
 Natural Resources
 Ways and Means

Major donors
Some of the top contributors to Sen. Lee's 2008 campaign, according to the National Institute on Money in State Politics:
 Kansas Contractors Association, Senate Democrats Committee, Pioneer Communications, Kansas National Education Association, Kansas Bankers Association

Energy and natural resources companies were her largest donor group.

References

External links
Kansas Senate Biography
Project Vote Smart profile
 Campaign contributions: 1996, 1998, 2000, 2002, 2004, 2006, 2008
 Sen. Lee on the Kansas Democratic Party website
 Janis K. Lee on Facebook

Democratic Party Kansas state senators
Living people
Women state legislators in Kansas
Kansas State University alumni
20th-century American women politicians
20th-century American politicians
21st-century American women politicians
21st-century American politicians
1945 births